The Washington State Office of Superintendent of Public Instruction, or OSPI, is the state education agency for the State of Washington. The agency is bound by the Washington State Legislature to implement state laws regarding education, including the 1993 education reform act which mandated  the controversial WASL standards based assessment. The Superintendent of Public Instruction is sixth (behind the Lieutenant Governor, Secretary of State, Treasurer, Auditor, and Attorney General, respectively) in the line of succession to the office of Governor of Washington. The current Superintendent of Public Instruction is Chris Reykdal.

Like all members of executive branch, the Superintendent of Public Instruction was established as a partisan position by the Washington State Constitution in 1889. However, an initiative to the people in 1938 made the position nonpartisan. Initiative 126 passed 293,202 to 153,142 and is codified as Chapter 1 Laws of 1939. Pearl Wanamaker became the first nonpartisan superintendent when she was elected in November 1940.

The agency is headquartered in the Old Capitol Building in Olympia.

Superintendents of Public Instruction

References

External links 
 Washington State Office of Superintendent of Public Instruction official website.

Office of Superintendent of Public Instruction
State departments of education of the United States